Paul Casey "Gus" Bradley (born July 5, 1966) is an American football coach who is the defensive coordinator for the Indianapolis Colts of the National Football League (NFL). He came to prominence as the defensive coordinator for the Seattle Seahawks from 2009 to 2012, where he was the original playcaller of the team's Legion of Boom secondary. Bradley later served as the head coach of the Jacksonville Jaguars from 2013 to 2016. Following his dismissal from Jacksonville, he returned to assistant coaching and became the Colts' defensive coordinator in 2022.

Early life
Bradley was the youngest child of six and grew up in Zumbrota, Minnesota, where he played football, basketball and baseball at Zumbrota High School.

College career
Bradley played college football at North Dakota State University from 1984 to 1988, where he was a free safety and punter. Bradley helped the Bison win the NCAA Division II Football Championship in 1984, 1987, and 1988, or three of the four years he played. He also was a four-time academic all-North Central Conference selection.

Bradley earned bachelor's degrees in business administration (1989) and physical education (1990) from North Dakota State as well as a master's degree in athletic administration from NDSU in 1992.

Coaching career

Early coaching career
Bradley joined the North Dakota State Bison as a graduate asst. coach in 1990 and was there until 1991. He was the defensive coordinator/linebackers coach at Fort Lewis College from 1992 to 1995 and spent four months as the team's head coach from December 1995 to March 1996. From 1996 to 2005 Bradley returned to North Dakota State and coached in many positions including defensive coordinator, linebackers coach, and assistant head coach to Bob Babich and Craig Bohl. Under Bradley's guidance, North Dakota State's defense led the Great West Football Conference in scoring defense (13.7 ppg), pass defense (150.3 ypg), total defense (272.4 ypg) and turnover margin (+1.00) in 2005.

Tampa Bay Buccaneers
In 2006, Bradley joined the Tampa Bay Buccaneers as their defensive quality control coach, working closely with defensive coordinator Monte Kiffin in the organization and implementation of the defensive game plan. In 2007 Bradley was promoted to linebackers coach after previous linebackers coach Joe Barry left to become defensive coordinator for the Detroit Lions. Under Bradley's guidance, linebacker Barrett Ruud went on to earn NFC Defensive Player of the Month in September after leading the Buccaneers defense with 51 tackles and adding one interception, three forced fumbles, two fumble recoveries and two passes defensed.

Seattle Seahawks

On January 12, 2009, the Seattle Seahawks hired Bradley to become the team's defensive coordinator. He was recommended for the job by former Buccaneers defensive coordinator Monte Kiffin.

In 2009, under Bradley's guidance the Seahawks' defense allowed opponents to gain 356.4 yards (24th in the league) and to score 24.4 points per game (25th). The Seahawks finished the season with a 5–11 record (3rd in the NFC West, 25th in the NFL), and subsequently replaced head coach Jim L. Mora with Pete Carroll. Carroll decided to keep Bradley for the 2010 season; the two coaches have a common connection with Kiffin.

In 2010, the Seahawks' defense allowed opponents to gain 368.6 yards (27th in the league) and to score 25.4 points per game (25th).

In 2011, the Seahawks' defense allowed opponents to gain 332.2 yards (9th in the league) and to score 19.7 points per game (7th).

In 2012, the Seahawks' defense allowed opponents to gain 306.2 yards per game (4th in the league) and to score 15.3 points per game (1st).

Jacksonville Jaguars

On January 17, 2013, Bradley was hired as the new head coach of the Jacksonville Jaguars. His first regular season win came on November 10, 2013 with a 29–27 victory over the Tennessee Titans. The Jaguars ended the season 4–12, and Bradley was eventually named the head coach of the South team in the 2014 Senior Bowl. On December 18, 2016, the Jaguars relieved Bradley of his duties as head coach, compiling a 14–48 record in 4 seasons.

Los Angeles Chargers
On January 20, 2017, the Los Angeles Chargers hired Bradley as defensive coordinator under head coach Anthony Lynn. After a 2017 season that saw the defense allow 17 points per game, the third-fewest in the NFL, Bradley received a three-year contract extension in January 2018.

Las Vegas Raiders
On January 12, 2021, Bradley was hired by the Las Vegas Raiders to be their defensive coordinator under head coach Jon Gruden, replacing Paul Guenther, who was fired during the 2020 season.

Indianapolis Colts
On February 4, 2022, Bradley was hired by the Indianapolis Colts as their defensive coordinator under head coach Frank Reich.

Head coaching record

References

External links

 Las Vegas Raiders bio

1966 births
Living people
American football punters
American football safeties
Fort Lewis Skyhawks football coaches
Jacksonville Jaguars head coaches
North Dakota State Bison football players
North Dakota State Bison football coaches
Tampa Bay Buccaneers coaches
Las Vegas Raiders coaches
Los Angeles Chargers coaches
Seattle Seahawks coaches
National Football League defensive coordinators
People from Zumbrota, Minnesota
Indianapolis Colts coaches